Fabio Fognini and Robert Lindstedt were the defending champions but chose not to participate this year.

Alexander Peya and Rajeev Ram won the title, defeating Nikola Mektić and Nicholas Monroe in the final, 6–3, 6–2.

Seeds

Draw

Draw

References
 Main Draw

ATP Shenzhen Open - Doubles
2017 Doubles